Cicero is an unincorporated community in Sumner County, Kansas, United States.  It is located about 4 miles northeast of Wellington at about 2.5 miles east of the intersection of U.S. Route 81 and E 50th Ave N, next to the railroad.

History
A post office was opened in Cicero in 1883, and remained in operation until it was discontinued in 1934.

Education
The community is served by Belle Plaine USD 357 public school district.

References

Further reading

External links
 Sumner County map, KDOT

Unincorporated communities in Sumner County, Kansas
Unincorporated communities in Kansas